The Swing may refer to:

 The Swing (Fragonard), oil painting by Jean-Honoré Fragonard, 1767
 The Swing (Renoir), oil painting by Pierre-Auguste Renoir, 1876
 The Swing (INXS album), 1984, also its title track, 1984
 "The Swing" (song), a song recorded by James Bonamy, 1997
 "The Swing", a poem by Robert Louis Stevenson published in A Child's Garden of Verses

See also
Swing (disambiguation)